Priyadarshini Ram is an Indian advertising executive, actor, and Telugu filmmaker. He won Nandi Special Jury Award for Manodu for his directorial making of the film.

Early life 
Although Ram was born in Tenali, he was educated in Bhilai, Delhi and Hyderabad, Andhra Pradesh. He graduated from Nizam College in 1980 and then received admission to Jamnalal Bajaj Institute of Management Studies. Unfortunately, his father died at the age of 13, so he could not pursue the course since he had to stay with his mother.

Career
Ram wrote a lot during his college days. His inclination towards creative writing got him into the field of advertising. He got a major break when he got an assignment to do advertising campaigns nationwide for acclaimed national political leaders in various languages.

His company received an acquisition offer by multinational advertising agency Grey America. They could not accept it because they wanted to move the firm to Mumbai. He could not go because he had to support his mother. Ram lost out on opportunities because he preferred to work in Hyderabad and the advertising capital of India had always been Mumbai.

In the late nineties, he first appeared in his own acting/directorial venture in a detective serial in Doordarshan's Telugu channel.

Tollywood
He emerged as a filmmaker with Manodu and then with Toss in Tollywood. He appeared on screen in Toss during a dance sequence with Raja. He appeared in a guest appearance in the film Missamma directed by Neelakanta. He did voice for Upendra in Toss.

Media
Ram is in charge of the Cinema and Entertainment section of Saakshi and writes under the pen name, 'Love Doctor'.

Filmography

References

External links
An Interview With Priyadarshini Ram

1955 births
Film directors from Andhra Pradesh
Living people
Telugu male actors
Telugu film directors
People from Guntur district
Male actors from Andhra Pradesh
Indian male film actors
Male actors in Telugu cinema
21st-century Indian male actors